Loboa may refer to:

Eisner Loboa (born 1987), Mexican footballer
Elizabeth G. Loboa, American engineering academic
Loboa loboi, former name of fungus  Lacazia loboi